Thomas Muster was the defending champion, but lost in the second round to Albert Portas.

Àlex Corretja won the title, by defeating Karol Kučera 6–2, 7–5 in the final.

Seeds
All seeds received a bye to the second round.

Draw

Finals

Top half

Section 1

Section 2

Bottom half

Section 3

Section 4

References

External links
 Official results archive (ATP)
 Official results archive (ITF)

Singles 1997
Mercedes Cup Singles